In the 1951–52 season, MC Alger is competing in the Division Honneur for the 16th season French colonial era, as well as the Forconi Cup and the North African Cup. They competing in Division Honneur, the Forconi Cup and the North African Cup.

Squad list
Players and squad numbers last updated on 30 September 1951.Note: Flags indicate national team as has been defined under FIFA eligibility rules. Players may hold more than one non-FIFA nationality.

Pre-season and friendlies

Competitions

Overview

Division Honneur

League table

Results by round

Matches

Forconi Cup

North African Cup

Squad information

Playing statistics

|-
! colspan=12 style=background:#dcdcdc; text-align:center| Goalkeepers

|-
! colspan=12 style=background:#dcdcdc; text-align:center| 

|}

Goalscorers
Includes all competitive matches. The list is sorted alphabetically by surname when total goals are equal.

Notes

References

External links
 L'Echo d'Alger : journal républicain du matin
 La Dépêche quotidienne : journal républicain du matin
 Alger républicain : journal républicain du matin

MC Alger seasons
Algerian football clubs 1951–52 season